Kadhayallithu Jeevitham is an Indian Malayalam-language arbitration-based reality court show adjudicating real-life family disputes. Ran from 2010 to 2020, it aired on Amrita TV on weekdays. Actress and psychologist Vidhubala hosted the show. Vidhubala invites aggrieved families to put forth their disputes and concerns and helps settle the matters to the satisfaction of both the parties. It is adapted from the Tamil show Solvathellam Unmai by Lakshmy Ramakrishnan.

Adaptations

References

2010 Indian television series debuts
2020 Indian television series endings